"After the Fire" is a song from the solo album Under a Raging Moon released by Roger Daltrey of The Who. The song was written by Pete Townshend, also of The Who. It was considered a hit for Daltrey, receiving extensive play on MTV. The song was played during the second season finale of Miami Vice during a flashback scene.

The song was originally planned to be played by The Who at Live Aid, and is about famine in Africa. However the band committed last minute and was unable to rehearse the song, so it was given to Daltrey to record for Under a Raging Moon.

The recording was produced by Alan Shacklock and recorded at RAK Recording Studios and Odyssey Studios, London. The album Under a Raging Moon was released on the Atlantic label (81269-1) in the U.S. in 1985, and singles were also released in other countries in the same year.

Townshend performed the song live, as part of his 1985 Deep End concerts with David Gilmour on guitar.

Track lists
UK release, 1985:
"After The Fire," 
"It Don't Satisfy Me" 
"Love Me Like You Do" (Andy Nye)

Australia release, 1985:
"After The Fire," 
"It Don't Satisfy Me"

Canada release, 1985:
"After The Fire," 
"It Don't Satisfy Me"

Italy release, 1985:
"After The Fire," 
"It Don't Satisfy Me"

Japan release, 1985:
"After The Fire," 
"It Don't Satisfy Me"

Mexico release, 1985:
"After The Fire," 
"It Don't Satisfy Me"

New Zealand release, 1985:
"After The Fire," 
"It Don't Satisfy Me"

Charts
"After the Fire" peaked at No. 48 on the U.S. charts and No. 3 on the U.S. rock charts.

Personnel
 Roger Daltrey – lead vocals, harmony vocals
 Mark Brzezicki – drums
 Tony Butler – bass
 Robbie McIntosh – guitars
 Bryan Adams – guitars 
 Nick Glennie-Smith – keyboards
 Alan Shacklock – piano
 Bruce Watson – E-bow

See also
Roger Daltrey discography

References

1985 singles
Songs written by Pete Townshend
1985 songs
Atlantic Records singles